David C. Grove (born 1935) is an American anthropologist, archaeologist and academic, known for his contributions and research into the Preclassic (or Formative) period cultures of Mesoamerica, in particular those of the Mexican altiplano and Gulf Coast regions. A lecturer and professor at University of Illinois at Urbana-Champaign (UIUC) for some thirty years, Grove retains a position as Professor Emeritus of Anthropology at UIUC and is also designated a Courtesy Professor of Anthropology at the University of Florida.

Notes

References

External links
 
 faculty page, University of Florida College of Liberal Arts and Sciences

Olmec scholars
American Mesoamericanists
American archaeologists
Mesoamerican archaeologists
Mesoamerican anthropologists
1935 births
University of Illinois Urbana-Champaign faculty
20th-century Mesoamericanists
21st-century Mesoamericanists
Living people
University of Florida faculty